The Raam is a small river in the eastern part of North Brabant, Netherlands. It flows into the Meuse at the old town Grave.

Rivers of North Brabant
Rivers of the Netherlands
Tributaries of the Meuse